Welland Transit was a public transportation agency in Welland, Ontario, Canada from 1977 to 2022. Upon its inception in 1973 the bus service was operated by a private company, known as "Metro Niagara Transit," funded by the city of Welland, which assumed full operation of the transit system in 1977. On January 1st, 2023, it was merged with St. Catharines Transit and Niagara Falls Transit to form Niagara Region Transit.

Eight scheduled routes provided Monday to Sunday daytime service with staggered services during off-peak times and evening service (between 6-11 pm Monday to Saturday). Weekday service was provided on three routes to destinations outside the city to Port Colborne, Niagara Falls, and St. Catharines, under Niagara Region Transit. For outlying areas of the city, a service called Trans-Cab offered taxi connections to the conventional bus service for a small additional fee. Accessible services for people unable to make use of regular buses were available within the city or across the region.

Facilities

Transit Offices and Garage
Address: 75 Federal Road 
Coordinates: 
Functions: Operations and administration, bus charters and bus maintenance/storage.

Transit Terminal
Address: 160 East Main St.
Coordinates: 
Opened: January 19th, 1994 
Functions: Hub for all city bus routes and provision of intercity services
 Niagara Region Transit service to St. Catharines and Niagara Falls
 Megabus/Coach Canada service to Toronto with local stops along the way

Former Services

Bus routes

Welland Transit operated the following routes;

Regular service
Core routes operated Monday through Friday from approximately 6:00AM to 11:00PM, on Saturday from approximately 6:30AM to 10:00PM, and Sunday from 10:00AM to 6:00PM.

 501 Broadway
 502 Rice Road
 503 First Avenue
 504 Fitch Street (a trans cab was used from July 2012 to July 2, 2013)
 505 Lincoln-Wellington
 506 Ontario Road
 508 Woodlawn
 509 Niagara

Student Link Services
23. Brock University Link provided September to May service between Niagara College in Welland and Brock University in St. Catharines, where there are bus connections available to St. Catharines, Thorold and Niagara Falls at the Brock University Hub. The route was taken over by Niagara Region Transit in September 2019, and renamed 70/75A - St Catharines Express via Pelham.
34. Niagara-on-the-Lake Link provided September to May service between the two campuses of Niagara College. This route was taken over by Niagara Region Transit in September 2019, renamed 40/45A - Niagara-on-the-Lake (NOTL) Express.

Special and Contracted Services
 Route 25 - Port Colborne Link made trips daily (except Sundays) and operated as a flag stop route as it connected downtown Port Colborne with downtown Welland.
 701/702. Port Colborne Community routes were offered until December 31, 2021 until they were scrapped for the Niagara Region Transit On-Demand Service.

Trans-Cab
Extended service to areas with insufficient traffic to warrant a regular bus route by means of a taxi connection to the existing bus network. Suburbs served are Cooks Mills, Dain City, Hunters Pointe, and Quaker Road Trans Cab Connections.

Well-Trans
Well-Trans (formerly Handi-Trans), provided accessible service for those not able to use a regular transit bus, for qualified pre-registered clients. The service operated between 7:15 am and 7:00 pm on weekdays and from 9:30 am to 6:15 pm on Saturdays, with service from 10 am to 6 pm on Sunday.

Niagara Specialized Transit
This service, operated by the Canadian Red Cross, is for eligible residents of Niagara Region who need to travel between municipalities for medical appointments, employment or education purposes.

See also

 Public transport in Canada

References

External links 
 Welland Transit official website
 Drawings and photos of Welland Transit buses

Transit agencies in Ontario
Transport in Port Colborne
Transport in Welland